The 2021 BRICS summit is the thirteenth annual BRICS summit, an international relations conference attended by the heads of state or heads of government of the five member states Brazil, Russia, India, China and South Africa. It was the third time that India hosted the BRICS Summit after 2012 and 2016. The summit was hosted virtually by video conference.

Meetings 
India hosted the first meeting of BRICS finance and central bank deputies through video conference. The meeting was co-chaired by Michael Patra, Deputy Governor, Reserve Bank of India and Tarun Bajaj, Secretary Department of Revenue, Ministry of Finance, India.

Participating leaders

References

Further reading 

 Lt Gen Prakash Katoch (27 March 2021). About Turn sans Trust will be Foolish. Indian Defence Review.

External links

21st-century diplomatic conferences (BRICS)
2021 conferences
2021 in India
2021 in international relations
BRICS summits
Diplomatic conferences in India